Ex parte Young, 209 U.S. 123 (1908), is a United States Supreme Court case that allows suits in federal courts for injunctions against officials acting on behalf of states of the union to proceed despite the State's sovereign immunity, when the State acted contrary to any federal law or contrary to the Constitution.

Facts
The state of Minnesota passed laws limiting what railroads could charge in that state and established severe penalties, including fines and jail for violators. Some shareholders of Northern Pacific Railway filed a lawsuit in the United States Circuit Court for the District of Minnesota asserting that the laws were unconstitutional as violating the Due Process Clause of the Fourteenth Amendment, as well as the Dormant Commerce Clause. The shareholders sued the railroads to prevent them from complying with the law. They also sued Edward T. Young, the Attorney General of Minnesota, to prevent him from enforcing the law.

Young argued that the Eleventh Amendment, which prohibits states from being sued in federal court by citizens of other states, meant that the court did not have jurisdiction to hear the case. The federal circuit court still issued an injunction against Young enforcing the law. The following day, Young filed a proceeding in Minnesota state court to force the railroads to comply with the statute, in violation of the federal injunction. The court ordered Young to explain his actions, and he reiterated his Eleventh Amendment claim. Finding that Young violated the injunction of the federal court by enforcing the Minnesota law in state court, the court held Young in contempt. Young was placed in the custody of the U.S. Marshals Service, and so he filed a petition with the United States Supreme Court for a writ of habeas corpus for his release.

Issue
The Supreme Court faced three issues here. The first involved three questions as to the constitutionality of the Minnesota statutes:
 Did the statutes violate Fourteenth Amendment due process by setting too low a cap on the rates that railroads could charge?
 Did the statutes violate Fourteenth Amendment due process by establishing punishments so harsh that no one would challenge the laws, for fear of the consequences of losing such a challenge?
 Did the statutes violate the Commerce Clause by interfering with commerce between the states?

The second issue exposed the tension between the Eleventh Amendment and the Fourteenth Amendment. The Eleventh Amendment had recently been held in Hans v. Louisiana, 134 U.S. 1 (1890), to prohibit the federal courts from hearing suits by citizens against their own states. Conversely, the Fourteenth Amendment prohibits the states from violating the due process rights of their citizens. Could a federal court entertain a lawsuit seeking to enjoin a state official from carrying out state laws that were purportedly in violation of the Fourteenth Amendment?

Result
The Court, in an opinion written by Justice Rufus Wheeler Peckham, found that the Minnesota laws with respect to the railroad rates were unconstitutional, and moved on to the issue of whether the state official could be enjoined from prosecuting violations of such laws.

Failure to enjoin the unconstitutional statute would require the person subject to a potential violation to either pay the increased rate or face the threat of prosecution. Therefore, the Court determined that it would be unfair to require challengers of a law to wait until they faced a harsh sanction before they could bring any kind of action questioning the validity of that law. The Court also noted that, although a number of cases had held that the state itself could not be sued, those cases did not prohibit enjoining a state official, as an individual, from carrying out some task on behalf of the state.

Young contended that he was merely acting for the state of Minnesota when he sought to enforce its laws. The Court disagreed, holding that when a state official does something that is unconstitutional, the official cannot possibly be doing it in the name of the state, because the Supremacy Clause of the Constitution means that the Constitution overrides all the laws of the states, invalidating any contrary laws. Therefore, when a state official attempts to enforce an unconstitutional law, that individual is stripped of his official character. He becomes merely another citizen who can constitutionally be brought before a court by a party seeking injunctive relief.

The Court, in laying out this doctrine, created two legal fictions:
 That such a suit is not against the state, but merely against the individual officer, who cannot be acting on behalf of the state when he enforces a law that is unconstitutional; and
 That an individual can be a state actor for Fourteenth Amendment purposes (which only prohibits unconstitutional acts by the state, and those who represent it) while remaining a private person for sovereign immunity purposes.

The Court also rejected the contention raised by Young that an injunction was inappropriate because the railroads could get an adequate remedy by testing the statute in the courts. The Court noted that the railroads could never recover the costs of obeying the law while waiting for it to be adjudicated unconstitutional.

Based on these findings, the Court held that suits may be brought to enjoin state officials from enforcing unconstitutional laws in the United States District Courts, which have the power to enjoin those officials from enforcing such laws.

Dissent
Justice John Marshall Harlan angrily dissented, writing that the only reason that the suit was brought against Young was because he represented the state, and that the result of the suit would be to "tie the hands of the state". This was therefore no different from a suit against the state itself, prohibited by the Eleventh Amendment.

Harlan observed that the state can never act except through its officers, and this decision would deprive the state of the representation of its officers in court. He therefore condemned the decision as a "radical change in our government system" that "would place the states of the Union in a condition of inferiority never dreamed of when the Constitution was adopted or when the Eleventh Amendment was made a part of the supreme law of the land."

Harlan also contended that Constitutional rights can be enforced by suits in the state courts, instead of the federal courts. If the state's trial courts did not enforce the Constitution, they could be appealed up to the state supreme court, which could then be appealed to the U.S. Supreme Court.

See Erwin Chemerinsky's opus Federal Jurisdiction.

See also
List of United States Supreme Court cases, volume 209

References

External links

United States Supreme Court cases
United States Eleventh Amendment case law
1908 in United States case law
Northern Pacific Railway
Legal history of Minnesota
United States Commerce Clause case law
United States Supreme Court cases of the Fuller Court